Jasper Donald Rine (born 1953) is an American scientist, a member of the National Academy of Sciences, and a Professor of Genetics, Genomics and Development at the University of California, Berkeley.

Rine received his B.S. from the State University of New York at Albany in 1975 and his Ph.D. in molecular genetics from the University of Oregon in 1979. He then joined the Berkeley faculty in 1982. He is also a former director of the Human Genome Center at Lawrence Berkeley National Laboratory and a fellow of the American Academy of Microbiology, an honorific leadership group of the American Society for Microbiology. As a graduate student with Ira Herskowitz Rine codiscovered yeast SIR proteins, conserved chromatin organizing proteins that modulate gene expression across taxa. As a professor, Rine was also one of the organizers of the Dog Genome Project. He was named a Howard Hughes Medical Institute professor in 2006. His work focuses on epigenetics and understanding the impact of human genetic variation.

Stolen laptop incident 

In 2005, a video was posted online depicting Rine speaking before a class and explaining that his laptop had been stolen. He warned the thief, whom Rine believed to be one of the students, that there was extremely sensitive data on the laptop from various sources, and that as a result the thief could end up serving time in federal prison. This was a bluff, as the laptop merely held confidential student information. The laptop was later recovered, and a man from San Francisco was subsequently arrested and charged by the Alameda County District Attorney's Office with possession of stolen property.

Honors and awards 

 2015 president of the Genetics Society of America

References

External links 

 

1953 births
Living people
21st-century American biologists
University of California, Berkeley faculty
University at Albany, SUNY alumni
University of Oregon alumni
Members of the United States National Academy of Sciences